Lâm Nhật Tiến (born September 3, 1971) is a Vietnamese American singer associated with the music label Asia Entertainment Inc. from 1994 to 2016. Lam is well known for his appearances in Asia's Videos and one of the top Vietnamese male pop stars.

Lam debuted in 1994 and rose to prominence as a Vietnamese pop icon in the late 1990s and early 2000s. According to musician Nam Loc, he also was the Asia Entertainment Inc.'s best-selling male pop artist during that time. Lam is considered one of the most talented and successful Vietnamese singers of his generation.

Early life and career

1971–1993: Early life 
Lam was born in Saigon and loved music from a young age. In 1981, he and his family immigrated to the United States and settled in Southern California. Before pursuing a career in singing, in March 1993, Lam earned a degree in Medical Radiology at Loma Linda University Medical Center. Lam also worked as a model for a couple of modeling agencies in Los Angeles and Orange County.

1994–1995: Career beginnings 
After photographer Vika Nguyen introduced him to Bach Dong, he asked Lam to collaborate with Asia Entertainment Inc. 
The handsome young singer began learning to play the drums with Truc Giang, the father of Truc Ho. Lam was also taking voice lessons to improve his singing technique and Vietnamese pronunciation at a college in Southern California. He is one of a few singers who can perform songs in Vietnamese, French, English, and Cantonese. His first appearance in front of an audience was in the Asia Video 8 - Đêm Nhạc Hội at Atlantic City, where he performed the song Quand le Printemps Revient (Vietnamese title: "Khi Mùa Xuân Trở Lại"). One of his most memorable experiences was at the Ritz Ballroom in Houston, where he performed songs in 4 languages.

In 1995, Lam enjoyed even greater success with Gia Huy, Nhat Quan, and Johnny Dung in the CD Bài 20. "Rồi Mai Đây" (Vietnamese adaptation of the famous Spanish song Lo mucho Que Te Quiero, lyrics by Vietnamese Canadian musician Truong Ky) was one of the most successful songs from this album.  Besides Rồi Mai Đây, "Bài 20", "Under The Boardwalk" he impressed listeners with "Quên Cả Lối Về" (written by Truc Giang) and "Tình Trong Bão Tố" (a version of La Maison Est En Ruine, a famous song by French singer Michel Delpech). Lam also dueted with Vina Uyen My on "Only Love Is Real" (an English adaptation of the famous Japanese song "Rouge" / ルージュ by Japanese singer Ayako Fuji) in the CD Giọt Mưa Thu. During this period, he also recorded a few songs, including Em Đẹp Như Mơ (original: Elle était si jolie), which were released on the Nhat Ha label.

In the early years, Lam would often performed in a group with fellow singers Johnny Dung, Nhat Quan, and Gia Huy. But he would eventually explode as a solo singer with his first major hit "Em Đã Quên Một Giòng Sông" (You forgot a river).

1996–1997: Một Lần Nữa Thôi, Em Đã Quên Một Giòng Sông and Yêu Em Âm Thầm 
Lam's popularity soared when Asia debuted the music video "Một Lần Nữa Thôi" in 1996, though he had the successful solo song Quên Cả Lối Về. Throughout 1997, Lam soon became distinguished with the video for the song "Em Đã Quên Một Giòng Sông" (launched in 1996). In the same year, he released a debut solo album with Asia Entertainment Em Đã Quên Một Giòng Sông (including cover versions of two well-known songs: "All by Myself" and "Un-Break My Heart"). The title track became one of the biggest hit songs in his career and one of the best pop songs in Vietnamese Music of the 1990s.

Soon after releasing a hit debut album, Lam continued to appear in Asia's Videos and released his 2nd studio album "Yêu Em Âm Thầm" which included 11 songs. Two of these songs are Vietnamese versions of his international songs: "Suy Tư Về Một Lời Nói" (Italian song: Le Tue Parole) and "Dối Gian" (Spanish song: Miente). The title track Yêu Em Âm Thầm become his next hit song.

Other successful songs from 1997 include Từ Độ Ánh Trăng Tan (music: Anh Bang, lyrics: Dang Hien), Mưa Tình Cuối Đông (composed by Truc Ho), Tôi Với Trời Bơ Vơ (written by Tung Giang), Nơi Ấy Bình Yên (written by Bao Chan); Cõi Mộng, Chợt Như Năm 18 (written by Quoc Dung), Tình Đầu Vẫn Khó Phai (music: Truc Ho, lyrics: Dang Hien), Kiếp Nào Có Yêu Nhau (music: Pham Duy, lyrics: Minh Duc Hoai Trinh), Nhớ Nhau Làm Gì (written by Tuan Hai & Le Kim Khanh), Hoa Vàng Mấy Độ (written by Trinh Cong Son), Tâm Hồn Cô Đơn (with Le Tam, Duy Linh, Gia Huy, written by Anh Bang), Cát Biển Chiều Nay (duet with Lam Thuy Van, composed by Truc Ho), Những Lời Dối Gian (Yan Bu You Zhong - 言不由衷, written by Liu Yu Rui & Xu Jialiang, Vietnamese lyrics: Khuc Lan), etc.

1998–2001: Làm Lại Từ Đầu, The Best of Chinese Melodies and Mãi Yêu Người Thôi 
In 1998, a 27-year-old Lam co-produced his 3rd solo studio album "Làm Lại Từ Đầu" with Truc Ho. The album included 11 tracks. Most tracks became popular with young overseas Vietnamese, such as Tình Yêu Như Mũi Tên (original song: El Choclo, Vietnamese lyrics by Tran Ngoc Son, the son of musician Anh Bang), I Could Love Again (composed by Vu Tuan Duc), the title track Làm Lại Từ Đầu, Đừng Nhắc Đến Tình Yêu, Về Đâu Hỡi Em, Đỉnh Gió Hú (composed by Truc Ho),  Shalala (Sha-La-La-La-La), and "Những Màu Kỷ Niệm" (duet with Le Tam, original song: "Eye in the Sky").

That same year, Lam dueted with Trish Thuy Trang on "That's Why (You Go Away)" was released on the album Don't Know Why. He also recorded Sài Gòn Vẫn Mãi Trong Tôi (music: Truc Ho, lyrics: Truc Ho - Anh Bang) and Những Đêm Chờ Sáng (written by Le Minh Bang). The official music videos for the songs released on Asia video 18 - Nhớ Sài Gòn and Asia video 21 - Những Tình Khúc Thời Chinh Chiến.

The next Lam's hit songs are "Làm Thơ Tình Em Đọc" and "Lời Dối Gian Chân Thành", which were released by Asia Entertainment Inc. on Asia video 23 - Tình Đầu Một Thời Áo Trắng and Asia Video 26 - Mưa in 1999. "Diary of Love" is a popular song by Le Tam and Lam from the album The Best of Chinese Melodies (released in 1999). The song is an English adaptation of the famous Chinese hit "Liang Ai Ri Ji" (戀愛日記) by Hong Kong singer Leon Lai. Lam continued to launch the release The Best of Chinese Melodies 2 in 2000, including 11 tracks. Many of these tracks have become famous such as Tình Ngang Trái, Tomorrow Will Come, Kiếp Ve Sầu, Nhớ Người, etc. In particular, Lam recorded two different versions of the same song: "Nhớ Người" is a Vietnamese version of "Don't Decorate Your Dream" (不装饰你的梦) by Hong Kong singer Terence Tsoi and the Cantonese version with the title Nhớ Người (Chinese version). Lam performed background vocal on Tomorrow Will Come (recorded by Trish Thuy Trang), an English version of "追梦人" by Fong Fei-fei. The song became famous throughout Overseas later.

One of Lam's biggest hits was released in 2000: Tình Yêu. This slow rock song first came out in Asia video 30: Dạ Vũ Quốc Tế 2 - Nhịp Bước Trên Sàn Nhảy. He also released his collaboration with Tu Quyen "Đêm Cô Đơn" on Eagle Productions label with the successful tracks such as the title track, Tình Đơn Phương (original: Let You Listen to My Heart - 心要让你听见 by Samuel Tai), Tình Yêu Muôn Thuở (a duet with Tu Quyen, original: 當愛變成習慣 by Jacky Cheung), Không Gia Đình, Nỗi Nhớ Dịu Êm, etc.

In the 1990s, Lam appeared in many of Asia's videos. He quickly made a name for himself as a solo artist. He became a celebrity for Asia and a pop icon in his own right in the late 1990s. In addition to being a solo singer for Asia, Lam is well known as a backup singer, photographer, and producer. He produced both two-CD The Best of Chinese Melodies and co-produced album Mãi Yêu Người Thôi with Thy Van and Truc Ho. He has also contributed to albums by young artists of Asia Entertainment: Lam Thuy Van, Le Tam, Gia Huy, Thanh Truc, Shayla, Trish Thuy Trang, etc. The video for the song My Only Regret by Shayla featured Lam as a co-director with Fred Paskiewiz.

After Lam had received Best Asia Artist of the year 2000 Award, he released his 4th studio album Mãi Yêu Người Thôi in 2001. The highly acclaimed album contained 9 Vietnamese songs and 1 English song (You Make Me Feel, written by Bonfire), which brought him to the peak of his career. One of 9 Vietnamese songs titled Làm Sao Anh Nói, is a Vietnamese version of How Could I (a popular song by Marc Anthony, written by Dan Shea, Cory Rooney & Gordon Chambers). In addition to Lam's hit songs Mãi Yêu Người Thôi and Dẫu Có Biết Trước, the album included a very famous Vietnamese song: Hà Nội Mùa Vắng Những Cơn Mưa.

Lam's emotional voice was also featured on the album Căn Gác Lưu Đày (which became one of the most successful songs in his career), singing about exiled humans, recorded by Various Artists. The music video for the title track released by Asia on Asia video 32 - Hành Trình Tìm Tự Do (2001).

2002–2004: The Best of Truc Ho & Lam Nhat Tien: Giữa Hai Mùa Mưa Nắng and collaboration with Thuy Nga 
Lam recorded a number of original songs and many of them became his hit songs: Một Lần Nữa thôi, Em Đã Quên Một Giòng Sông, Yêu Em Âm Thầm, Đỉnh Gió Hú, Nếu Không Có Em, Và Hôm Nay, Làm Lại Từ Đầu, Đừng Nhắc Đến Tình Yêu, Làm Thơ Tình Em Đọc, Lời Dối Gian Chân Thành, Tình Yêu, Sẽ Hơn Bao Giờ Hết, Dẫu Có Biết Trước, Giữa Hai Mùa Mưa Nắng, Sài Gòn Vẫn Mãi Trong Tôi. Released in 2002, "The Best of Truc Ho - Lam Nhat Tien: Giữa Hai Mùa Mưa Nắng" is an album consisted of 22 selected songs were composed by Truc Ho.

Lam debuted at the 67th event of the show Paris by Night (In San Jose) with the song Thế Giới Không Tình Yêu, which was written by Nguyen Duy An. This song quickly became a big hit, which helped him gain and even more impressive following. In the period from 2002 to 2004, he has appeared in a total of 8 Paris by Night's shows, dueted with 5 famous female artists, including Khánh Hà, Lưu Bích, Như Quỳnh, Minh Tuyết, and Như Loan.

In 2002, he released his collaboration album with Lam Thuy Van and Phuong Nghi: Liên Khúc Tình Yêu 4. He continued to record the highly successful album Liên Khúc Chinese Top Hits (2003) with Johnny Dung, Thien Kim, and Ho Ngoc Nhu, which included 4 medleys of the Vietnamese adaptations' famous Chinese hits. In 2004, Lam beautifully covered "Ne me quitte pas" (Vietnamese title: Người Yêu Nếu Ra Đi) in French and Vietnamese at Live show Asia 42 - Âm Nhạc Vòng Quanh Thế Giới. The version also released in 2005 on the album Giờ Đã Không Còn Nữa.

2005–2009: Thiên Thai, Nói Với Tôi Một Lời and Tình Ca Anh Bằng 2 - Từ Thuở Yêu Em 
In 2005, Lam's career continue to move up the ladder as he successfully performed one of the classic songs of Vietnam "Thiên Thai" at Live show Asia 48 - 75 Năm Âm Nhạc Việt Nam. Soon after Thiên Thai, Lam released a Vietnamese version of "(Where Do I Begin?) Love Story" - Chuyện Tình in Asia's video 49 - Âm Nhạc Vòng Quanh Thế Giới 2. One year later, Lam's success continued with the release of his 6th studio album, Nói Với Tôi Một Lời, which contained both Thiên Thai and Chuyện Tình. At Live show Asia 56 - Yêu Đời & Yêu Người - Mùa Hè Rực Rỡ 2007, Lam and Don Ho performed a medley of the famous French songs (Liên Khúc Nhạc Pháp) and got a positive feedback from the audience.
In 2009, Lam made an appearance at Live show Asia 62 - Anh Bằng, Một Đời Cho Âm Nhạc, where he received Best Male Pop Artist Award, with a country-pop song Từ Thuở Yêu Em. The song was written by Anh Bang and included on the album: Tình Ca Anh Bằng 2 - Từ Thuở Yêu Em.

2010–2012: Bên Kia Bờ Đại Dương 

In 2012, Lam launched his 7th studio album: Bên Kia Bờ Đại Dương.

2013–2016: Triệu Con Tim and Chúng Tôi Muốn Sống 
In 2013, he made an appearance in Asia's video 71 - 32nd Anniversary Celebration together with many artists of Asia Entertainment singing a song that was written by Truc Ho titled Triệu Con Tim (Million Hearts). Lam continued to perform for Asia Shows up until 2016 with his final performance being in Asia 78, where he sang "Chúng Tôi Muốn Sống" (We want to live).

2017–present 
In 2016, Lam continued his solo career after he had left Asia Entertainment Inc.

Personal life 
At a live show ″Asia 54 - Trầm Tử Thiêng, Trúc Hồ (Bước Chân Việt Nam)″ in 2007, Lam told the audience that he has been successful in treating drug addiction and came back to himself.

Charity 
Lam is a supporter of charities concerning the Army Republic of Vietnam soldiers' welfare. He has participated in the concerts to give thanks for soldier's contribution named Đại Nhạc Hội Cám Ơn Anh together with many other artists. He has also produced several concert programs at homes for the aged and participated in support programs for the homeless.

Discography

Solo album CDs 
Em Đã Quên Một Giòng Sông (released on 1. January 1997)
Yêu Em Âm Thầm (released in 1997)
Làm Lại Từ Đầu (released on 3. March 1998)
Mãi Yêu Người Thôi (released in August 2001)
The Best of Truc Ho & Lam Nhat Tien: Giữa Hai Mùa Mưa Nắng (released in 2002)
Nói Với Tôi Một Lời (released November 2006)
The Best of Lam Nhat Tien: Bên Kia Bờ Đại Dương (released November 2012)

Compilations 
Giữa Hai Mùa Mưa Nắng: The Best of Lam Nhat Tien and Truc Ho
The Best of Lam Nhat Tien: Bên Kia Bờ Đại Dương

Collaboration CDs 
Đêm Cô Đơn (Duet CD with Tu Quyen)
The Best of Chinese Melodies (with Le Tam and Lam Thuy Van)
The Best of Chinese Melodies 2 (with Le Tam, Trish Thuy Trang and Shayla)
Liên Khúc Tình Yêu 4 (with Lam Thuy Van and Phuong Nghi)
Liên Khúc Chinese Top Hits (with Thiên Kim, Hô Ngoc Như and Johnny Dung)
Chinese Remix III (with Lam Thuy Van, Ánh Minh and Le Nguyen)
Tình Ca Trúc Hồ: Tình Yêu và Tình Người (With Nguyen Hong Nhung)
Tình Ca Trúc Hồ: Em Có Còn Yêu Anh  (With Nguyen Hong Nhung)

Various Artists CDs 
Cho Kỷ Niệm Mùa Đông (1994)
Gọi Tên Em (1995)
Bài 20 (1995)
Giọt Mưa Thu (1995)
Một Lần Nữa Thôi (1996)
Nơi Ấy Bình Yên (1997)
The Best of Dạ Vũ 6 (1997)
Bên Em Là Biển Rộng (1997)
Đỉnh Gió Hú (1998)
The Best of Rumba - Hãy Yêu Nhau Đi (1998)
Khi Chuyện Tình Đã Cuối (1998)
Lời Nói Yêu Đầu Tiên (1999)
Thanh Trúc - Em Vẫn Mơ (1999)
Lê Tâm - Điều Gì Đó (1999)
Tình Ca Trúc Hồ - Sẽ Hơn Bao Giờ Hết (2000)
Đừng Hỏi Vì Sao (2000)
Gởi Anh (2000)
Vùng Biển Vắng (2000)
Riêng Một Góc Trời (2000)
Trish - Don't Know Why (2001)
Anh Còn Nợ Em (2001)
Căn Gác Lưu Đày (2001)
Như Anh Cần Em (2002)
Chiều Trong Tù (2002)
Xin Còn Gọi Tên Nhau - Tình Khúc Trường Sa (2003)
Top Hits 14 - Thế Giới Không Tình Yêu (2003)
Top Hits 16 - Nhớ... Nửa Vầng Trăng (2003)
Top Hits 17 - Xóa Hết Nợ Nần (2003)
Dấu Chân Của Biển (2004)
Top Hits 19 - Tiếng Hát Từ Nhịp Tim (2004)
Top Hits 21 - Yêu Mãi Ngàn Năm (2004)
Top Hits 22 - Quên Đi Hết Đam Mê (2004)
Lang Thang Dưới Mưa (2004)
Top Hits 23 - Đắng Cay (2005)
Giờ Đã Không Còn Nữa (2005)
Tuyển Tập Trần Thiện Thanh 1 - Người Ở Lại Charlie (2006)
Thiên Kim - Tình Đời (2007)
Tình Khúc Trúc Hồ - Tội Nghiệp Thân Anh (2007)
The Best Of Ngọc Hạ - Suối Mơ (2008)
Tình Ca Anh Bằng 1 - Chuyện Hoa Tigôn (2009)
Tình Ca Anh Bằng 2 - Từ Thuở Yêu Em (2009)
Chỉ Là Phù Du Thôi (2009)
Liên Khúc Phượng Hoàng (2010)
Mai Thanh Sơn - Nụ Hôn Cuối (2011)

DVDs 
The Best of Lam Nhat Tien
Lam Nhat Tien Live Show (cancelled)
The Best of Lam Nhat Tien: Vet Thuong Doi Long

Music Videos 
Gọi Tên Em - Appelles-moi (1995)
Một Lần Nữa Thôi (1996)
Em Đã Quên Một Giòng Sông (1996)
Nơi Ấy Bình Yên (1997)
Đừng Nhắc Đến Tình Yêu (1998)
Những Đêm Chờ Sáng (1998)
Sài Gòn Vẫn Mãi Trong Tôi (1998)
Về Đâu Hỡi Em (1998)
Làm Thơ Tình Em Đọc (1999)
Dối Gian (1999)
Lời Dối Gian Chân Thành (1999)
Anh Không Chết Đâu Anh (2000)
Căn Gác Lưu Đày (2001)
Chiều Trong Tù (2002)
Con Đường Việt Nam (2002)
Nhớ Mẹ (2017)

Awards 

Asia Best Artist 2000
Asia Best Male Pop Artist 2009

References

External links
Asia Entertainment, Inc

1971 births
Living people
People from Ho Chi Minh City
Vietnamese emigrants to the United States
21st-century Vietnamese male singers
21st-century American male singers
21st-century American singers
20th-century Vietnamese male singers